The Girl on the Stairs is a 1925 American silent mystery film directed by William Worthington and starring Patsy Ruth Miller, Niles Welch and Arline Pretty.

Synopsis
After discovering that her lover is already married, a young woman gets engaged to another man. However, her attempts to recover embarrising love letters from her former lover lead to her being accused of murder when he is found dead.

Cast
 Patsy Ruth Miller as Dora Sinclair 
 Frances Raymond as Agatha Sinclair 
 Arline Pretty as Joan Wakefield 
 Shannon Day as Mañuela Sarmento 
 Niles Welch as Frank Farrell 
 Freeman Wood as Dick Wakefield 
 Bertram Grassby as José Sarmento 
 Michael Dark as Wilbur 
 George Periolat as Dr. Bourget

References

Bibliography
 Munden, Kenneth White. The American Film Institute Catalog of Motion Pictures Produced in the United States, Part 1. University of California Press, 1997.

External links

1925 films
1925 mystery films
American mystery films
Films directed by William Worthington
American silent feature films
American black-and-white films
Producers Distributing Corporation films
1920s English-language films
1920s American films
Silent mystery films